Sea Mills is a suburb of the English port city of Bristol. Sea Mills previously was part of the city ward of Kingsweston. Following a Local Government Boundary Commission review in 2015 ward boundaries were redrawn and Sea Mills is now split between the Stoke Bishop ward and the Avonmouth and Lawrence Weston ward.

History

Pre 20th century 
Sea Mills was the site of a Roman settlement, known as Portus Abonae. Its origin may have been as a military settlement but by the early second century, a civilian town had been established. It was important enough to feature in the 3rd-century Antonine Itinerary which documents towns and distances in the Roman empire, and was connected to Bath by a road. Archaeological excavations have found evidence of the street pattern, shops within the town and cemeteries outside it.  The Roman settlement seems to have been abandoned by the 4th century, and there is no evidence of Saxon settlement.

By the Middle Ages Bristol had become a major port, with all traffic between the port and the sea having to pass through the Avon Gorge and past Sea Mills. In 1712, Joshua Franklyn, a Bristol merchant, built a wet dock at Sea Mills, to eliminate the need for large sailing ships to navigate the dangerous River Avon any further upstream. This was located where the River Trym enters the River Avon. However, poor transport links doomed the enterprise and the harbour facilities fell into disrepair by the end of the 18th century. Some remains of the dock still exist and are used as a harbour by pleasure craft.

Other industries included agriculture (Sea Mills Farmhouse still exists) and water mills at Clack Mill (a corn mill just below Dingle Road  Bridge) and Coombe Mill (for flour production) just beyond the Blaise Estate car park in The Dingle.  Both mills were old and appear on the 1746-1803 mapping on the Know Your Place web site.

Sea Mills Garden Suburb 
After WW1 Sea Mills was one of several areas in Bristol to be developed as municipal housing by the Bristol Corporation under the 1919 housing legislation known as the Addison Act. The Act was designed to address the shortage of quality housing for working people and provide homes for the thousands of troops returning from WW1. Houses built under the Addison Act are often referred to as "homes for heroes".  

On 4 July 1919 Dr Christopher Addison visited the building sites at Hillfields and Sea Mills. At Sea Mills he gave a short speech and the Lady Mayoress, Emily Twiggs planted an Oak sapling. The tree, known as Addison's Oak still stands today and in 2019 was a runner up in the Woodland Trust tree of the year competition. 

The land on which Sea Mills is built was purchased by Bristol Corporation from Philip Napier Miles of Kingsweston House and developed on garden city principles, including building at no more than 12 houses per acre. Building began in 1919 and by October 1920 sixteen houses were already occupied. The early houses were built to the standards specified by the Tudor Walters report, including a parlour downstairs, and three bedrooms upstairs.  

The suburb includes two small shopping areas, one at Westbury Lane and another on Shirehampton Road featuring a symmetrical arrangement of shops around a green bisected by roads. This is known as Sea Mills Square and is now home to the Cafe on the Square  and the Sea Mills mini-museum. The Square was also once the site of one of the 13 Trench style police boxes which were erected in Bristol in 1932 to serve the suburbs in lieu of new police stations. 

During WW2 a large air raid shelter was provided on Sea Mills Square.  For this and other information about the residents see the wartime stories on the Sea Mills 100 web site.

After WW2 a small estate of prefabricated bungalows were built adjacent to the Portway and also in nearby Coombe Dingle. These have since been demolished.

Centenary celebrations 
In 2019 the Sea Mills 100 project, funded by the National Lottery Heritage Fund and Bristol City Council celebrated the centenary of the 'homes for heroes' municipal housing. Events included a 100 birthday celebration for Addison's Oak and a weekend long heritage trail around the estate. Its lasting legacy is a mini-museum situated in a K6 phone box  which was renovated by local volunteers as part of the project. The project also published a book called 'How Lucky I Was' written by people who grew up in the area between the 1930s - 1950s, including novelist Derek Robinson.

Sport and recreation 
Sea Mills has a football team Sea Mills Park FC, formed in 1925. The 1st team play in the Bristol Premier Combination. They historically played their games at the Rec, opposite Sea Mills Square, but play all home games at Kingsweston Sports & Social, Napier Miles. They were  Bristol & District Senior League Champions 2012/13.

October 2006 saw the opening of The Portway Rugby Development Centre. The facilities there are two outdoor 3G Crumb pitches, suitable for rugby and football, outdoor grass rugby pitches, and grass training grids. There are two meeting rooms. Local football clubs use this facility including Wanderers FC. Bristol's rugby clubs use the facilities also, from St Brendans RFC to Clifton RFC.

Transport
In 1865, the Bristol Port and Pier Railway opened from Hotwells to a deep water pier on the Severn Estuary at Avonmouth. Sea Mills railway station was one of the original stations on the line. The station still exists, although the line is now part of the National Rail network, and the line has been extended to run from Bristol Temple Meads to Severn Beach. In 2021 a mural created by Graft which features the flora and fauna of the area and was created at the station in consultation with local people. 

The A4 Portway trunk road passes along the south-west edge of Sea Mills and links central Bristol with its port at Avonmouth. Running parallel to the River Avon, the Portway was the most expensive road in Britain when it was opened in 1926. Both the Portway and the railway line have bridges over the harbour outfall into the Avon.

Ocean-going ships used to sail past Sea Mills, going to and from Bristol Docks. Nowadays most of the shipping is in the form of pleasure craft, Bristol's main docks now being at Avonmouth and Portbury.

There are frequent bus services to the city centre, Westbury and Cribbs Causeway.

Notable people 
Robin Cousins, former Olympic champion figure skater
Roger Hallett, artist
The Cougars, band
Derek Robinson, novelist
Simon King, broadcaster

References

External links 
 Sea Mills history
 
Sea Mills 100 heritage project
Higgins, David "The History of the Bristol Region in the Roman Period" (PDF) Bristol Branch of the Historical Association. Retrieved 30 Dec 2021

Areas of Bristol